Samuel Oluwaseyi Adegoke is a Nigerian-American actor known for playing Jeff Colby in the Dynasty reboot series.

Personal life
Adegoke was born in Lagos, Nigeria, but raised in Minneapolis, Minnesota and St. Paul, Minnesota. His parents were missionary ministers and came to the United States when he was a young child. 
He is the youngest of seven children. Adegoke studied marketing and finance at the University of Minnesota, and was president of the Black Student Union, vice-president in his fraternity, and served in student government.

In 2015, after a two-week nationwide search that garnered more than 7,000 submissions, Adegoke was named the winner of the third annual ABC Discovers: Digital Talent Competition. Adegoke lives in Los Angeles.

Career
On January 30, 2017, Adegoke was cast as a lead in the Lifetime biopic Michael Jackson: Searching for Neverland playing Michael Jackson's bodyguard Javon Beard. Adegoke also recurred on Murder in the First and had guest spots on Code Black and NCIS: Los Angeles. In February 2017, he was cast as Jeff Colby in a Dynasty reboot for The CW, which premiered in October 2017.

Filmography

Film

Television

References

External links
 
 

Living people
Actors from Minnesota
American people of Nigerian descent
People from Lagos
Year of birth missing (living people)
American film actors
American television actors
Residents of Lagos